Shanaia Ricelle Galorport Gomez (born May 15, 2002), better known as Shanaia Gomez is a Filipino-Italian singer, model, host, and actress. She is best known for appearing in the 10th season of the ABS-CBN reality show Pinoy Big Brother.

Career

2016–2019: Career Beginnings
In 2016, Gomez had a vacation in Manila, Philippines for the first time. During her stay, she tried VTR go-sees and eventually landed a role in a Maggi commercial with actor Ian Veneracion. In the same year, she won first runner-up in the 2016 Miss Philippines Canada, and eventually became a commercial model.

In 2017, at the age 14, she went back to the Philippines again to try her luck and pursue a career in the showbiz industry. She started her career in GMA, but since she didn't speak any Tagalog at that time, projects were a little hard for her.

In 2019, she auditioned for the singing competition Idol Philippines. She made it until the mid-rounds.

2021–present: BearKada, PBB, and He's Into Her
In 2021, she was among the 2nd batch of artists to be signed to Star Magic and its subsidiary Rise Artist Studio. She regularly hosts for the studio's online show We Rise Together along with DJ Jai Ho and the other Rise artists. She also became a part of the He's Into Her series' BearKada and hosted the online show BearKada Hangout along with Bianca De Vera, River Joseph, Jae Miranda, and Milo Elmido Jr. where they hangout with the casts of He's Into Her every after an episode is aired.

Following the success of He's Into Her, the casts of the show headlined a special online concert, He's Into Her: The Benison Ball. Gomez, and the other BearKada were the chosen hosts for the show.

In the same year, she joined the 10th season of Pinoy Big Brother—Pinoy Big Brother: Kumunity Season 10 as part of the first batch of housemates in the Celebrity Edition, having been evicted on day 57 alongside fellow housemate Benedix Ramos.

In 2022, she made her acting debut as she starred in the third season of iWant TFC's original anthology series, Click, Like Share for the episode Swap with fellow Rise artist Belle Mariano.

In February, her fellow housemates Alexa Ilacad and KD Estrada (a.k.a. KDLex) headlined their own fan concert through KTX.ph entitled Closer: The KDLex Fan Con. She appeared on the concert as one of the guest performers and sang Girlfriend—a song she co-wrote with fellow housemates Kyle Echarri and KD Estrada while they were inside the Big Brother House.

From being a BearKada, Gomez became Dominique as she was among the additional casts that joined the second season of the breakthrough series He's Into Her.

In the same year, The second season of reality singing television competition Idol Philippines premiered on June 25, 2022 on Kapamilya Channel, A2Z and TV5. An online show, titled The Next Idol PH, airs on the show's UpLive account and on Kapamilya Online Live during commercial breaks. The show is hosted by the show's former contestants: Gomez, together with Anji Salvacion, Matty Juniosa, Enzo Almario, Lucas Garcia, Gello Marquez, and Fana. The show airs live via Zoom from the hosts' respective places at the time of the show's broadcast (prior to Live Shows). The show usually interviews the season's contestants following their performances on the show's broadcast.

In July, Gomez released her debut single Para Sa'yo. Released under Star Pop, the hopeful and upbeat song narrates the positive impact an uplifting relationship can have on a person.

Filmography

Television/Digital

Shows Hosted

Concerts

Online

Live

Music Video

Discography

Singles

Appears On

Notes

References

2002 births
Living people
Filipino people of Italian descent
21st-century Filipino women singers
21st-century Irish women musicians
Pinoy Big Brother contestants
21st-century Canadian actresses